Mason Township may refer to:

Mason Township, Yell County, Arkansas in Yell County, Arkansas
Mason Township, Effingham County, Illinois
Mason Township, Cerro Gordo County, Iowa
Mason Township, Taylor County, Iowa
Mason Township, Arenac County, Michigan
Mason Township, Cass County, Michigan
Mason Township, Murray County, Minnesota
Mason Township, Marion County, Missouri
Mason Township, Lawrence County, Ohio

Township name disambiguation pages